You're Next is a 2011 American slasher film directed and edited by Adam Wingard, written by Simon Barrett and starring Sharni Vinson, Nicholas Tucci, Wendy Glenn, A. J. Bowen, Joe Swanberg, Barbara Crampton and Rob Moran. The plot concerns an estranged family under attack by a group of masked assailants during a family reunion.

The film had its world premiere at the 2011 Toronto International Film Festival Midnight Madness program and was theatrically released on August 23, 2013, in the United States. The film grossed over $26 million from a $1 million production budget and has since gained a cult following.

Plot

The film opens with a couple, Talia and Erik Harson, having sex. Afterwards, Talia walks around the house, not noticing that the motion sensor light outside had turned out. After a shower, Erik finds "you're next" written on the window in Talia's blood; her body is lying dead on the ground. An attacker wearing a lamb mask attacks Erik and kills him with a machete.

Erin accompanies her boyfriend, Crispin Davison, to his family reunion at their vacation home in rural Missouri. Present are Crispin's parents Aubrey and Paul, Crispin's older brother Drake and his wife Kelly, Crispin's younger siblings Felix and Aimee, and their partners, Zee and Tariq, respectively.

During dinner, someone shoots crossbow bolts through the window, one of which hits Tariq in the head and kills him, with another wounding Drake. The survivors discover that their cell phone reception has been jammed. Aimee runs outside for help but runs into a garrote wire which slices her throat, killing her. Erin is briefly attacked by an attacker in a tiger mask in the kitchen, but she fights him off as he escapes through the kitchen door. Paul puts Aubrey to bed, but an intruder wearing a fox mask, who was hiding under the bed, murders Aubrey with a machete, leaving the words "you're next" in blood on the wall.

Kelly discovers Fox Mask, panics and flees the house, going to Erik's house nearby. Upon discovering Erik's corpse, Lamb Mask throws her through the window and kills her by driving an ax into the side of her head. Crispin leaves the house to look for help. Tiger Mask attacks Erin with an ax but she crushes his skull by beating him with a meat tenderizer.

Paul finds sleeping bags and food wrappers that indicate the killers have been staying in the house for some time. He finds Felix and Zee and starts to explain it to them, only for Fox Mask to slit his throat with a machete. It is then revealed that Felix and Zee hired the assassins to murder the family so they could collect their inheritance. Lamb Mask finds Tiger Mask's corpse and flips the dinner table over in rage. He discovers a wounded Drake hiding, but retreats after Erin stabs him with a screwdriver. Erin sets up nail traps by the house's entrances, explaining to Zee that she grew up in a survivalist compound where she learned combat and survival skills. Felix meets Drake in the basement and kills him out of pity by stabbing him with multiple screwdrivers.

On the upper floor, Erin comes across Paul's body. She jumps through a window to escape Fox Mask, injuring her leg. Lamb Mask is injured by one of her nail traps. While hiding, Erin overhears an argument between Felix, Zee, Fox Mask, and Lamb Mask where it was revealed that Lamb Mask and Tiger Mask were brothers. Her cell phone beeps to indicate that her text to 911 has gone through, alerting the killers. She is able to ambush and kill Lamb Mask by stabbing him in the head.

Realizing she cannot outrun Fox Mask with a wounded leg, Erin sets a trap at the front door where an ax would fall and kill anyone who opened the door. Fox Mask enters through a window, so Erin lures him into the basement, where she blinds him with a camera before cracking his skull with a log, killing him. Zee and Felix attempt to kill Erin themselves, but she kills Felix by shredding the top of his head with a blender before stabbing Zee in the top of the head with a knife. Felix's cell phone rings and Erin answers without speaking. Believing he is speaking to Felix, Crispin reveals his involvement in the scheme. Erin confronts him when he returns, and Crispin explains that she was never meant to be targeted. After he attempts to bribe her into staying quiet, she kills him in disgust by stabbing him in the neck and eye.

A police officer arrives and shoots Erin in the shoulder, having seen her kill Crispin. After calling for backup, he attempts to enter the house and falls victim to Erin's front door trap, with the axe hitting him in the head just as the movie cuts to a blood splattered "You're next".

Cast

 Sharni Vinson as Erin
 Nicholas Tucci as Felix Davison
 Wendy Glenn as Zee
 A. J. Bowen as Crispin Davison
 Joe Swanberg as Drake Davison
 Rob Moran as Paul Davison
 Barbara Crampton as Aubrey Davison
 Sarah Myers as Kelly Davison
 Amy Seimetz as Aimee Davison
 Ti West as Tariq
 Lane Hughes as Tom / Wolf Mask
 L.C. Holt as Craig / Lamb Mask
 Simon Barrett as Dave / Tiger Mask
 Larry Fessenden as Erik Harson
 Kate Lyn Sheil as Talia
 Calvin Reeder as Officer Trubiano

Production

Development
Barrett wrote the film after Wingard told him that he wanted to do a home invasion movie, noting that they were the only films that still truly frightened him.

From there, Barrett wrote a script inspired by Agatha Christie mysteries as well as a combination of screwball comedies and chamber mysteries. Barrett would later note that Bay of Blood was probably in the back of his mind when writing the film, although he only realized this after the fact.

Wingard credited the film's humor to Barrett's sense of humor and cynicism. Some of the dinner conversations were improvised and based on real-life experiences the filmmakers had with family members.

Filming
The film was shot in 2011 at a mansion in Columbia, Missouri. Filming took place over four weeks, and shooting consisted mostly of night shoots filmed from 7 p.m. to 7 a.m.

Release

You're Next premiered on September 17, 2011 at the 2011 Toronto International Film Festival and opened at other film festivals later.

Four days after its premiere, Lionsgate acquired American, British, and Canadian distribution rights to the film for just $2 million. The film was part of the competition during the 20th edition of the international festival of fantastic movies at Gerardmer (France) in February 2013, and it won the Syfy prize of the event.

Box office

The film opened in the United States on August 9, 2013 and earned $7,020,196 in its opening weekend. The film closed on October 17, having grossed $18,494,006 in the domestic box office and $8,401,475 overseas for a worldwide total of $26,895,481.

Critical response
Rotten Tomatoes reports an approval rating of 79% based on 159 reviews, with an average rating of 6.6/10. The site's critical consensus states, "You're Nexts energetic and effective mix of brutal gore and pitch black humor will please horror buffs and beyond". Metacritic gives the film a score of 66 out of 100, based on 32 critics, indicating "generally favorable reviews". Audiences polled by CinemaScore gave the film an average grade of "B−" on an A+ to F scale.

Vanity Fairs Jordan Hoffman called You're Next "one of the more entertaining horror pictures of the last 10 years". Chris Nashawaty of Entertainment Weekly gave the film a B+, praising "Wingard's canny knack for leavening his characters' gory demises with sick laughs and clever Rube Goldberg twists (razor-sharp piano wire hasn't been used this well since 1999's Audition). It's like Ordinary People meets Scream" and describing the final shot as "deliciously twisted". R. Kurt Osenlund of Slant Magazine gave the film 4 stars, stating the film "brazenly merges the home-invasion thriller with the dysfunctional family dramedy". Joshua Rothkopf (Time Out New York) called the film "solidly satisfying" and a "minor triumph", although he commented that the film was, in general, unoriginal. Matt Glasby of Total Film called the film "funny and tense, rather than hilarious and terrifying", and complimented the film for being a "good" horror-comedy. Barbara VanDenburgh (Arizona Republic) gave the film 3.5 out of 5 stars, stating the film was not "very scary" and that its "budget for red food coloring was no doubt higher than the one for script doctoring", although she complimented the film's score and "gruesome" conclusion. Mark Jenkins of The Washington Post said the movie "is at times bloodily entertaining. And if the central plot twist isn't all that clever, at least the movie offers some motivation for its mayhem", while Jane Horwitz wrote for the same newspaper: "For slasher/horror fans 17 and older, You're Next may provide sufficient homicidal entertainment". Liam Lacey (The Globe and Mail) gave the film 2.5 out of 4 stars, describing it as "well-executed" but "rudimentary".

A review from St. Louis Post-Dispatch called the film unoriginal, while Rene Rodriguez (The Miami Herald) panned the film, calling it "practically insulting", and dubbed the premise "idiotic". John DeFore (The Hollywood Reporter) wrote that the film's characters were mostly unsympathetic and that more humor would have improved the film. Stephen Whitty of The Newark Star-Ledger, in a review for The Portland Oregonian, gave the film a C+ rating, agreeing it was unoriginal and uninventive, comparing it to The Purge and The Last House on the Left. Scott Bowles of USA Today gave You're Next a negative review, describing it as repetitive and stating that it did not have a purpose.

Total Film placed Erin (Sharni Vinson) at number one on their list of "50 Most Bad-Ass Female Horror Leads".

Home media
The film was released via video on demand on December 27, 2013, and via DVD and Blu-ray on January 14, 2014.

See also
 List of films featuring home invasions

References

External links

 
 
 
 

2011 films
2011 comedy horror films
2011 black comedy films
2011 horror thriller films
2011 independent films
2010s slasher films
American black comedy films
American horror thriller films
American independent films
American slasher films
2010s English-language films
Fiction about familicide
Films about dysfunctional families
Films about contract killing
Films about mass murder
Films directed by Adam Wingard
Films set in Columbia, Missouri
Films set in country houses
Films shot in Columbia, Missouri
Home invasions in film
Icon Productions films
Lionsgate films
Films produced by Keith Calder
Films with screenplays by Simon Barrett (filmmaker)
Films produced by Simon Barrett (filmmaker)
Films scored by Adam Wingard
2010s American films